In statistics, a probit model is a type of regression where the dependent variable can take only two values, for example married or not married. The word is a portmanteau, coming from probability + unit. The purpose of the model is to estimate the probability that an observation with particular characteristics will fall into a specific one of the categories; moreover, classifying observations based on their predicted probabilities is a type of binary classification model.

A probit model is a popular specification for a binary response model. As such it treats the same set of problems as does logistic regression using similar techniques. When viewed in the generalized linear model framework, the probit model employs a probit link function. It is most often estimated using the maximum likelihood procedure, such an estimation being called a probit regression.

Conceptual framework
Suppose a response variable Y is binary, that is it can have only two possible outcomes which we will denote as 1 and 0. For example, Y may represent presence/absence of a certain condition, success/failure of some device, answer yes/no on a survey, etc. We also have a vector of regressors X, which are assumed to influence the outcome Y. Specifically, we assume that the model takes the form
 
The parameters β are typically estimated by maximum likelihood.

It is possible to motivate the probit model as a latent variable model.  Suppose there exists an auxiliary  random variable
 
where ε ~ N(0, 1). Then Y can be viewed as an indicator for whether this latent variable is positive:
 

The use of the standard normal distribution causes no loss of generality compared with the use of a normal distribution with an arbitrary mean and standard deviation, because adding a fixed amount to the mean can be compensated by subtracting the same amount from the intercept, and multiplying the standard deviation by a fixed amount can be compensated by multiplying the weights by the same amount.

To see that the two models are equivalent, note that

Model estimation

Maximum likelihood estimation
Suppose data set  contains n independent statistical units corresponding to the model above.

For the single observation, conditional on the vector of inputs of that observation, we have:

The likelihood of a single observation  is then

In fact, if , then , and if , then .

Since the observations are independent and identically distributed, then the likelihood of the entire sample, or the joint likelihood, will be equal to the product of the likelihoods of the single observations:

The joint log-likelihood function is thus
 
The estimator  which maximizes this function will be consistent, asymptotically normal and efficient provided that E[XX] exists and is not singular. It can be shown that this log-likelihood function is globally concave in β, and therefore standard numerical algorithms for optimization will converge rapidly to the unique maximum.

 
where
 

Semi-parametric and non-parametric maximum likelihood methods for probit-type and other related models are also available.

Berkson's minimum chi-square method

This method can be applied only when there are many observations of response variable  having the same value of the vector of regressors  (such situation may be referred to as "many observations per cell"). More specifically, the model can be formulated as follows.

We assume that there are indeed "many" observations per each "cell": for each .

Denote
 
 

 

It can be shown that this estimator is consistent (as n→∞ and T fixed), asymptotically normal and efficient. Its advantage is the presence of a closed-form formula for the estimator.

Gibbs sampling
Gibbs sampling of a probit model is possible because regression models typically use normal prior distributions over the weights, and this distribution is conjugate with the normal distribution of the errors (and hence of the latent variables Y*).  The model can be described as

From this, we can determine the full conditional densities needed:

The result for β' is given in the article on Bayesian linear regression, although specified with different notation.

The only trickiness is in the last two equations.  The notation  is the Iverson bracket, sometimes written  or similar.  It indicates that the distribution must be truncated within the given range, and rescaled appropriately.  In this particular case, a truncated normal distribution arises.  Sampling from this distribution depends on how much is truncated.  If a large fraction of the original mass remains, sampling can be easily done with rejection sampling—simply sample a number from the non-truncated distribution, and reject it if it falls outside the restriction imposed by the truncation.  If sampling from only a small fraction of the original mass, however (e.g. if sampling from one of the tails of the normal distribution—for example if  is around 3 or more, and a negative sample is desired), then this will be inefficient and it becomes necessary to fall back on other sampling algorithms.  General sampling from the truncated normal can be achieved using approximations to the normal CDF and the probit function, and R has a function rtnorm() for generating truncated-normal samples.

Model evaluation

The suitability of an estimated binary model can be evaluated by counting the number of true observations equaling 1, and the number equaling zero, for which the model assigns a correct predicted classification by treating any estimated probability above 1/2 (or, below 1/2), as an assignment of a prediction of 1 (or, of 0). See  for details.

Performance under misspecification

Consider the latent variable model formulation of the probit model. For example, suppose  and  where  is a continuous positive explanatory variable. More importantly, the estimator for  becomes inconsistent, too. To deal with this problem, the original model needs to be transformed to be homoskedastic. Therefore,  and running probit on  generates a consistent estimator for the conditional probability 

When the assumption that  is normally distributed fails to hold, then a functional form misspecification issue arises: if the model is still estimated as a probit model, the estimators of the coefficients  are inconsistent. For instance, if  follows a logistic distribution in the true model, but the model is estimated by probit, the estimates will be generally smaller than the true value. However, the inconsistency of the coefficient estimates is practically irrelevant because the estimates for the partial effects, will be close to the estimates given by the true logit model.

To avoid the issue of distribution misspecification, one may adopt a general distribution assumption for the error term, such that many different types of distribution can be included in the model. The cost is heavier computation and lower accuracy for the increase of the number of parameter. In most of the cases in practice where the distribution form is misspecified, the estimators for the coefficients are inconsistent, but estimators for the conditional probability and the partial effects are still very good.

One can also take semi-parametric or non-parametric approaches, e.g., via local-likelihood or nonparametric quasi-likelihood methods, which avoid assumptions on a parametric form for the index function and is robust to the choice of the link function (e.g., probit or logit).

History 
The probit model is usually credited to Chester Bliss, who coined the term "probit" in 1934, and to John Gaddum (1933), who systematized earlier work.

A fast method for computing maximum likelihood estimates for the probit model was proposed by Ronald Fisher as an appendix to Bliss' work in 1935.

See also
 Generalized linear model
 Limited dependent variable
 Logit model
 Multinomial probit
 Multivariate probit models
 Ordered probit and ordered logit model
 Separation (statistics)
 Tobit model

References

 
 Published in:

Further reading

External links

 by Mark Thoma

Categorical regression models
Classification algorithms